Llano County is a county located on the Edwards Plateau in the U.S. state of Texas. As of the 2020 census, its population was 21,243. Its county seat is Llano, and the county is named for the Llano River.

During the American Civil War, the county was on the frontier, and Llano County's soldiers spent more time defending against Indian attacks than they did invading Yankees. In 1869, pioneer rancher John Wesley Snyder led a cattle drive from Llano County along the Chisholm Trail to Abilene, Kansas.

In the 1870s, a pioneer community known as Baby Head existed in Llano County. According to local legend, a small child was killed by Native Americans, and her remains were left on a hill called Baby Head Mountain.  Jodie May McKneely (died January 1, 1884) originated the Baby Head Cemetery. The pioneer town no longer exists, but the cemetery still remains and is still accepting the dead.

History

 Peaceful Tonkawa tribe first inhabitants
 1842 April 20 –  Adelsverein Fisher-Miller Land Grant sets aside three million acres (12,000 km2) to settle 600 families and single men of German, Dutch, Swiss, Danish, Swedish, and Norwegian ancestry in Texas.
 1844, June 26 – Henry Francis Fisher sells interest in land grant to Adelsverein
 1845  December 20 – Henry Francis Fisher and Burchard Miller sell their rights in the land grant to Adelsverein.
 1847 Meusebach–Comanche Treaty Bettina commune, last Adelsverein community in Texas, is established by a group of free thinking intellectuals, and named after German liberal Bettina Brentano von Arnim. The community fails within a year due to lack of any governing structure and conflict of authority.
 1852 Settlers at Tow and Bluffton on the Colorado River.
 1854 May 14–15, The Texas State Convention of Germans meet in San Antonio and adopt a political, social and religious platform, including: 1) Equal pay for equal work; 2) Direct election of the President of the United States; 3) Abolition of capital punishment; 4)  “Slavery is an evil, the abolition of which is a requirement of democratic principles..”; 5) Free schools – including universities – supported by the state, without religious influence; and 6) Total separation of church and state.
 1860  Population 1,101 – 21 slaveholders, 54 slaves
 1862  One hundred Llano County volunteers join Major John George Walker Division of the Confederate States Army.
 1864, April – A cavalry company is formed in Llano County under Captain Brazeal to defend the area from Indian attacks. It served under Brig. Gen. John David McAdoo until the war's end, when it disbanded in June 1865.
 1873, August 4 – Packsaddle Mountain becomes the site of the region's last battle with the Indians.  The county's farming economy begins to grow after threats of Indian attacks cease.
 1892, June 7  – Llano branch of Austin and Northwestern Railroad arrives
 1893 Completion of County Courthouse, designed by Austin architect A O Watson
 1895 Llano County Jail erected by the Pauly Jail Building and Manufacturing Company of St Louis, MO
 1900 Frank Teich establishes the Teich Monument Works
 1901 Llano Women's Literary Society organized – 16 charter members
 1901 The Victorian style Antlers Hotel, a railroad resort in Kingsland, opened for business.

Darmstadt Society of Forty

Count Castell of the Adelsverein negotiated with the separate Darmstadt Society of Forty to colonize 200 families on the Fisher–Miller Land Grant in Texas.  In return, they were to receive $12,000 in money, livestock, and equipment, and provisions for a year.  After the first year, the colonies were expected to support themselves. The colonies attempted were Castell, Leiningen, Bettina, Schoenburg and Meerholz in Llano County; Darmstädler Farm in Comal County; and Tusculum in Kendall County. Of these, only Castell survives. The colonies failed after the Adelsverein funding expired, and also due to conflict of structure and authorities. Some members moved to other Adelsverein settlements in Texas.  Others moved elsewhere, or returned to Germany.

Library book purges

Llano county libraries were purged of books containing nudity, sex education, and discussion of racism in 2021 and 2022 by county commissioners. Titles removed include In the Night Kitchen, Caste: The Origins of Our Discontents, and Between the World and Me. Librarian Suzette Baker in Kingsland was fired for her refusal to remove books from the shelves. The library board voted unanimously to close its meetings to the public in 2022.

Geography

Enchanted Rock, a designated state natural area and popular tourist destination, is located in southern Llano county.

Two significant rivers, the Llano and the Colorado, flow through Llano County.  These rivers contribute to Lake Buchanan, Inks Lake, and Lake Lyndon B. Johnson, which are all located partially within the county.

Major highways
  State Highway 16
  State Highway 29
  State Highway 71
  State Highway 261

Adjacent counties
 San Saba County (north)
 Burnet County (east)
 Blanco County (southeast)
 Gillespie County (south)
 Mason County (west)

Demographics

Note: the US Census treats Hispanic/Latino as an ethnic category. This table excludes Latinos from the racial categories and assigns them to a separate category. Hispanics/Latinos can be of any race.

As of the 2000 census, 17,044 people, 7,879 households, and 5,365 families resided in the county.  The population density was 18 people per square mile (7/km2).  There were 11,829 housing units at an average density of 13 per square mile (5/km2).  The racial makeup of the county was 96.3% White, 0.3% Black or African American, 0.4% Native American, 0.4% Asian, <0.1% Pacific Islander, 1.8% from other races, and 0.8% from two or more races.  About 5.1% of the population were Hispanics or Latinos of any race.

Of the 7,879 households, 16.9% had children under the age of 18 living with them, 59.5% were married couples living together, 5.0% had a female householder with no husband present, and 31.9% were not families. About 28.3% of all households were made up of individuals, and 16.0% had someone living alone who was 65 years of age or older.  The average household size was 2.13 and the average family size was 2.56.

In the county, the population was distributed as 15.9% under the age of 18, 4.5% from 18 to 24, 18.4% from 25 to 44, 30.5% from 45 to 64, and 30.7% who were 65 years of age or older.  The median age was 53 years. For every 100 females, there were 94.4 males.  For every 100 females age 18 and over, there were 91.7 males.

The median income for a household in the county was $34,830, and for a family was $40,597. Males had a median income of $30,839 versus $21,126 for females. The per capita income for the county was $23,547.  About 7.2% of families and 10.3% of the population were below the poverty line, including 17.2% of those under age 18 and 6.0% of those age 65 or over.

Communities

Cities
 Horseshoe Bay (partly in Burnet County)
 Llano (county seat)
 Sunrise Beach Village

Census-designated places
 Buchanan Dam
 Buchanan Lake Village
 Kingsland

Other unincorporated communities
 Bluffton
 Castell
 Tow
 Valley Spring

Ghost towns
 Baby Head
 Bettina
 Click

Notable people
 Emil Kriewitz, who lived with the Penateka Comanche, served as guide for Fisher–Miller Land Grant settlers, 1870 Llano County justice of the peace, 1871 Llano County election judge, and postmaster of Castell from 1876 to 1883. He was buried in Llano County Cemetery.

Politics

See also

 Adelsverein
 Badu Building
 German Texan
 List of museums in Central Texas
 Llano County Courthouse and Jail
 National Register of Historic Places listings in Llano County, Texas
 Recorded Texas Historic Landmarks in Llano County
 Southern Hotel

References

Further reading

External links
 Llano County government’s website
 

 
1856 establishments in Texas
German-American history
Texas Hill Country
Populated places established in 1856